Ordnett is a Norwegian online dictionary service, published and maintained by Kunnskapsforlaget, a privately held publishing house. Ordnett offers access to 50 dictionaries, covering 11 languages. This makes it the largest, commercially available dictionary database in Norway. Thirteen of the dictionaries are either oneway or twoway English (with Norwegian being the opposite language), including 3 publications from Oxford University Press.

Ordnett is available through an ordinary web browser. It is a subscription based service, offering annual or monthly subscriptions.

Dictionaries 

 Norwegian Dictionary
 Dictionary of Foreign Words
 Norwegian Dictionary of Synonyms
 Orthographic Dictionary of Nynorsk
 Orthographic Dictionary of Bokmål
 Norwegian Dictionary of Antonyms and Synonyms
 Bokmål-Nynorsk Dictionary
 Dictionary of Riksmål
 Medical Dictionary
 Encyclopedia of Law
 Norwegian-English Dictionary
 English-Norwegian Dictionary
 Norwegian-English Comprehensive Dictionary 
 English-Norwegian Comprehensive Dictionary 
 Norwegian-English Technical Dictionary
 English-Norwegian Technical Dictionary
 Norwegian-English Dictionary of Economics 
 English-Norwegian Dictionary of Economics 
 Norwegian-English Medical Dictionary 
 English-Norwegian Medical Dictionary 
 The Oxford Dictionary of English
 The Oxford Sentence Dictionary
 The Oxford Thesaurus of English
 The Oxford Dictionary of Quotations
 The Oxford Concise Medical Dictionary
 The Oxford Dictionary of Economics
 The Oxford Dictionary of Finance and Banking
 The Oxford Dictionary of Business and Management
 The Oxford Dictionary of Science
 Norwegian-Swedish Dictionary
 Swedish-Norwegian Dictionary
 Norwegian-French Dictionary
 French-Norwegian Dictionary 
 Monolingual French Dictionary Le Robert
 Norwegian-Spanish Dictionary 
 Spanish-Norwegian Dictionary 
 Monolingual Spanish Dictionary Larousse
 Norwegian-German Dictionary 
 German-Norwegian Dictionary 
 Norwegian-German Technical Dictionary 
 German-Norwegian Technical Dictionary 
 Monolingual German Dictionary PONS
 Norwegian-Italian Dictionary
 Italian-Norwegian Dictionary
 Norwegian-Russian Dictionary
 Russian-Norwegian Dictionary
 Norwegian-Portuguese Dictionary
 Portuguese-Norwegian Dictionary
 Norwegian-Chinese Dictionary
 Chinese-Norwegian Dictionary
 Norwegian-Arabic Dictionary
 Arabic-Norwegian Dictionary

History 
Ordnett.no was launched in April 2004. In December 2007 Ordnett was made available as an offline service, called Ordnett Pluss. Both program and dictionary content is downloaded and installed on Windows computers. Like its online counterpart Ordnett Pluss is subscription based, depending on online renewal.

External links
 Ordnett website
 Kunnskapsforlaget publishing house

Norwegian websites
2004 establishments in Norway
Online dictionaries